The Defence Act 1903 (Cth) is an Act of the Parliament of the Commonwealth of Australia, that acquired royal assent on 22 October 1903. It was created to allow for the naval and military defence of Australia. The Act was amended and expanded over time to legislate for and repeal conscription, to incorporate the Naval Defence Act 1910 and the Air Force Act 1923, and today governs how the Australian Defence Force operates.

Background 
On 1 January 1901, the federation of the Australian Colonies to form the Commonwealth of Australia was proclaimed, with the newly in force Constitution of Australia requiring that the colonial military forces be combined under the Commonwealth.

Act

Original 
The Act, as originally made, consisted of 11 parts, 124 sections, and 3 schedules.

Current 
As of 2021, the Act is divided into 24 parts, 359 sections, and 1 schedule.

Administration 
Part II and Part III's Division 1 covers the administrative aspects of the defence force. The rest of part III covers the requirements of service, including reservist service, and remuneration. Part IV deals with the citizenry's liability to serve within the defence forces, while part V covers the Australian Defence Force Cadets. Part VI charges the Governor–General with special powers. Part VII to IX deal with disputes and offences committed under the act.

Analysis

Amendments

Legacy

See also 

 Australian Army
 Military history of Australia

References 

Acts of the Parliament of Australia
Law of Australia
Australian defence policies